Alexander Hutchinson may refer to:

 Alexander Hutchinson (footballer) (1908–?), Scottish footballer
 Alexander Hutchinson (Vermont politician) (1764–1853), Vermont politician who served as State Auditor

See also
Alex Hutchinson (born 1934), Australian Jazz musician
Alex Hutchinson (video game director)